Gosberton railway station was a station in Gosberton, Lincolnshire. It was opened in 1882 and closed for passengers on 11 September 1961 and freight on 7 December 1964.

References

External links
 Gosberton station on navigable 1947 O. S. map

Disused railway stations in Lincolnshire
Former Great Northern and Great Eastern Joint Railway stations
Railway stations in Great Britain opened in 1882
Railway stations in Great Britain closed in 1961